That's Life is the second album by English punk rock band Sham 69, released in November 1978.

That's Life peaked at number 27 on the UK Albums Chart. The album includes the singles "Hurry Up Harry" and "Angels with Dirty Faces", which reached numbers 10 and 19 respectively on the UK Singles Chart. In 1989, That's Life and the band's debut album Tell Us the Truth were re-released as a double LP.

Track listing
All tracks composed by Jimmy Pursey and Dave Parsons; except where indicated
 "Leave Me Alone"
 "Who Gives a Damn"
 "Everybody's Right Everybody's Wrong"
 "That's Life"
 "Win or Lose"
 "Hurry Up Harry"
 "Evil Way"
 "Reggae Pick Up Part 1" (Pursey)
 "Sunday Morning Nightmare"
 "Reggae Pick Up Part 2" (Pursey)
 "Angels with Dirty Faces"
 "Is This Me or Is This You" (Parsons, Dave Tregunna, Mark Cain)
CD reissue bonus tracks
 "The Cockney Kids Are Innocent"
 "If the Kids Are United"
 "No Entry"

Personnel
Sham 69
Jimmy Pursey – vocals, production, cover design, photography, liner notes
Dave Parsons – guitars, liner notes
Dave Tregunna – bass
Mark "Dodie" Cain – drums

Technical
Peter Wilson – production, engineer
Grant Fleming – voice between tracks 
Brian Burrows – remixing
Steve Hammonds – project coordinator
Alwyn Clayden – package design
Shane Baldwin – liner notes
Barry Plummer – photography

Charts

References

1978 albums
Sham 69 albums
Polydor Records albums